Mark Proctor  (born 9 December 1968 in Bridlington, East Riding of Yorkshire) is a British former racing driver who competed in a wide range of championships. In the mid-1990s he raced rallycross, twice coming 2nd in his class in the British Rallycross Championship. In 1996 he switched to Eurocar BV8 series, coming 2nd in 1998 and 5th in the following 2 seasons.

In 2001 the ASCAR series brought US-style stock car racing to a wider UK audience, and Mark was a stalwart driver for several seasons, finishing in the series top 10 three times.

However, for 2005 he entered the British Touring Car Championship for the first time, for the small Fast-Tec team in an ex-Rob Collard Vauxhall Astra, finishing 15th overall. For 2006 the team bought a Honda Civic that had won races the previous season in the hands of Tom Chilton, but was not competitive and pulled out after 5 rounds due to a lack of motivation. He made a return a month later at Snetterton, and continued at Knockhill. He scored points in 4 of the 6 races at those 2 rounds, but entered no further BTCC rounds.

In 2009 he competed in the Ginetta G50 Cup, winning the Chairman's Cup for drivers over 40 in round 1, but suffered a huge crash in the second race at Oulton Park which caused it to be postponed. He slammed into the stationary car of Carl Breeze, which had spun and lay side-on in the middle of the circuit, at close to full speed. Both drivers received medical treatment but although Breeze suffered no serious injuries, Proctor suffered a fractured L4 vertebra.

He confirmed his immediate retirement from racing upon medical advice in an interview with Louise Goodman on ITV4's coverage of the BTCC from Croft.

He has two children, one of whom (Senna) is also a racing driver.

Racing record

Complete British Touring Car Championship results
(key) (Races in bold indicate pole position – 1 point awarded just in first race) (Races in italics indicate fastest lap – 1 point awarded all races) (* signifies that driver lead race for at least one lap – 1 point awarded all races)

References

Living people
British Touring Car Championship drivers
People from Bridlington
1968 births
English racing drivers
Racing drivers from Yorkshire
ASCAR drivers
Ginetta GT4 Supercup drivers
Renault UK Clio Cup drivers